The Hull & District League is a BARLA winter league for clubs from Kingston upon Hull, East Riding of Yorkshire. It consists of clubs playing in two divisions. It is one of only four amateur leagues older than the British Amateur Rugby League Association.

History

The British Amateur Rugby League Association (BARLA) was created in 1973 in Huddersfield at the George Hotel by a group of enthusiasts concerned about the dramatic disappearance of many amateur leagues and clubs. Fewer than 150 amateur teams remained with a mere thirty youth rugby league teams.

One of BARLA's first acts was to merge the vast majority of the district leagues into five regional leagues: the Yorkshire League, the Cumbria League, the West Yorkshire Sunday League, the Pennine League and the North Western Counties League. For geographical reasons the Hull & District League (renamed the Humberside League) and the Southern League were left unmerged.

The Hull and District Youth Rugby League Association was established in October 1975 and was the result of the failure to get rugby league played in the senior high schools.

A Sunday League was introduced in 1982 but Sunday rugby league died out in the second half of the 1990s.

The BARLA National League (now the National Conference League) had its first season in 1986/1987 season with 10 teams: Dudley Hill, Egremont Rangers, Heworth, Leigh Miners Welfare, Milford Marlins, Millom, Pilkington Recs, West Hull, Wigan St Patrick's and Woolston Rovers. West Hull were Hull's representative in the national league but the NCL has subsequently added more divisions and more Hull-based sides have left the Hull & District League to join the national league.

2012-13 Line-Up

Past winners

See also

 British Amateur Rugby League Association 
 British rugby league system
 National Conference League

External links 
 Hull & District league official website
 BARLA Official Website

BARLA competitions
Rugby league in the East Riding of Yorkshire
Sport in Kingston upon Hull